Brian Hibbard (26 November 1946 – 17 June 2012) was a Welsh actor and singer from Ebbw Vale, Wales, best remembered as the lead vocalist in the original The Flying Pickets.

Early life and career
Hibbard was born into a working class family in Ebbw Vale, Monmouthshire, and had a socialist upbringing. He was educated at Ebbw Vale Grammar School. After various jobs including teacher, steel worker, barman and chimney sweep, he formed The Flying Pickets with a group of other actors who had practised a cappella singing while travelling by coach to their appearances.

Following the group's success in the early 1980s, Hibbard went on to pursue a career as a television actor, appearing in Coronation Street as garage mechanic Doug Murray, in Emmerdale as Bobby-John Downes, and as Johnny Mac in the Welsh language soap Pobol y Cwm as well as the youth drama Pam Fi, Duw?. In 1995 he played Jason in an episode of the fifth series of Heartbeat. He was in the 1997 film Twin Town as the self-styled "Karaoke King" Dai Rees. He has also appeared in the drama serial Making Out; in the Doctor Who story Delta and the Bannermen; in comedy in The Armando Iannucci Shows; in Series 9 Ep 3 of Minder, and Satellite City; and in the film Rancid Aluminium. Hibbard appeared in EastEnders from 4 to 8 July 2011 playing Henry Mason, a man who ran a children's home where Billy Mitchell and Julie Perkins were in care.

Death
In 2000, Hibbard was diagnosed with prostate cancer; he died of the disease on 17 June 2012 at the age of 65. He is survived by his wife Caroline and their three children.

References

External links
 

1946 births
2012 deaths
Welsh male singers
British male soap opera actors
British male film actors
Welsh socialists
British socialists
People from Ebbw Vale
The Flying Pickets members
Deaths from cancer in Wales
Deaths from prostate cancer